The 1968 South Carolina United States Senate election was held on November 5, 1968, to select the U.S. Senator from the state of South Carolina.  Incumbent Democratic Senator Fritz Hollings easily defeated Republican state senator Marshall Parker in a rematch of the election two years earlier to win his second, (his first full), term.

Democratic primary
Fritz Hollings, the incumbent Senator, easily defeated his primary opponent, John Bolt Culberson.

Republican primary
Marshall Parker, the state senator from Oconee County in the Upstate, was persuaded by South Carolina Republicans to enter the race and he did not face a primary challenge.

General election campaign
After a close election loss to Fritz Hollings in 1966, the Republicans felt that Parker might have a chance at defeating Hollings by riding Nixon's coattails in the general election.  However, the Republicans did not provide Parker with the financial resources to compete and he subsequently lost by a bigger margin to Hollings than two years prior.

Election results

 
 

|-
| 
| colspan=5 |Democratic hold
|-

See also
List of United States senators from South Carolina
United States Senate elections, 1968

References

"Supplemental Report of the Secretary of State to the General Assembly of South Carolina." Reports and Resolutions of South Carolina to the General Assembly of the State of South Carolina. Volume II. Columbia, SC: 1969, p. 19.

South Carolina
1968
1968 South Carolina elections